Alexander Murray was an Anglican priest  in Ireland during the 17th century.

Murray was educated at Trinity College Dublin.  He was Dean of Killala from 1674 until his death in 1701.

Notes

Alumni of Trinity College Dublin
17th-century Irish Anglican priests
18th-century Irish Anglican priests
Deans of Killala
17th-century births
1701 deaths
Year of birth unknown